Fraizer is a surname. Notable people with the surname include:

Alexander Fraizer (1610?–1681), Scottish physician
Nelson Frazier Jr. (1971–2014), American professional wrestler

See also
Frazer (name)